Henry Street High School is located in Whitby, Ontario, within the Durham District School Board. The school offers programs for students in grades 9–12 and a wide range of academic and extracurricular activities.

The school was originally known as "Whitby District High School"; the name was changed after the opening of Whitby's second high school, Anderson, in 1960.

Notable alumni
 Ryan Kellogg, baseball player
 Andrea Lawes, curler
 Tom Lawson, hockey player

See also
List of secondary schools in Ontario

References

External links
 Henry Street High School

High schools in the Regional Municipality of Durham
Education in Whitby, Ontario
1954 establishments in Ontario
Educational institutions established in 1954